Eupithecia depasta is a moth in the family Geometridae. It is found in Gambia.

References

Moths described in 1994
depasta
Moths of Africa